The 1977 Artistic Gymnastics World Cup was held in Oviedo, Spain in 1977.

Medal winners

All-around

References

1977
Artistic Gymnastics World Cup
International gymnastics competitions hosted by Spain
1977 in Spanish sport